Karakeçili can refer to:

 Karakeçili
 Karakeçili, Boğazkale
 Karakeçili, Çorum